Ermita is a district of Manila, Philippines. 

Ermita may also refer to:

Ermita (novel), a novel by F. Sionil José
Ermita "Ermi" Rojo, the protagonist of the novel
Ermita metro station, Mexico City
Ermita Church, Manila, Philippines

See also
 Hermitage (religious retreat)